The 2021–22 Fehérvár FC season is the club's 81st season in existence and the 23rd consecutive season in the top flight of Hungarian football. In addition to the domestic league, Fehérvár are participating in this season's editions of the Hungarian Cup and the inaugural UEFA Conference League.

Squad

Transfers

Summer

In:

Out:

Source:

Winter

In:

Out:

Source:

Competitions

Overview

Nemzeti Bajnokság I

League table

Results summary

Results by round

Matches

Hungarian Cup

UEFA Conference League

First qualifying round

Appearances and goals
Last updated on 15 May 2022.

|-
|colspan="14"|Youth players:

|-
|colspan="14"|Out to loan:

|-
|colspan="14"|Players no longer at the club:

|}

Top scorers
Includes all competitive matches. The list is sorted by shirt number when total goals are equal.
Last updated on 15 May 2022

Disciplinary record
Includes all competitive matches. Players with 1 card or more included only.

Last updated on 15 May 2022

Clean sheets
Last updated on 15 May 2022

References

External links 

Fehérvár FC seasons
Fehervar FC
Fehervar FC